Dhamek Stupa (also spelled Dhamekh and Dhamekha) is a massive stupa located at the archaeological site of Sarnath in the state of Uttar Pradesh, India. Dhamek Stupa marks the precise location where the Buddha preached his first discourse to his first five disciples (Kaundinya, Assaji, Bhaddiya, Vappa and Mahanama), and where all five eventually became fully liberated.

Etymology
The name Dhamek derives from the Sanskrit word dharmeksā, which means "pondering of the law" in the Sanskrit language.

Location

Description
Dhamek Stupa is the most massive structure in Sarnath. In its current shape, the stupa is a solid cylinder of bricks and stone reaching a height of 43.6 meters and having a diameter of 28 meters. The basement seems to have survived from Ashoka's structure, while the stone facing displays delicate floral carvings characteristic of the Gupta era. The wall is covered with exquisitely carved figures of humans and birds, as well as inscriptions in Brahmi script. The stupa was enlarged on six occasions but the upper part is still unfinished.

An Ashoka pillar with an edict engraved on it stands near the site.

History
Dhamek Stupa marks the precise location where the Buddha preached his first discourse to his first five disciples (Kaundinya, Assaji, Bhaddiya, Vappa and Mahanama), and where all five eventually became fully liberated. This event marked the formation of the sangha. Several of the ancient sources describe the site of this first sermon as a Mriga-dayaa-vanam or a sanctuary for animals. (In Sanskrit, the word mriga is used in the sense of game animals, with deer being the most common).

After the parinirvana of the Buddha in 544 BCE, his remains were cremated and the ashes were divided and buried under eight stupas, with two further stupas encasing the urn and the embers. Dhamek Stupa was presumably among these eight stupas. In 249 BCE, Mauryan King Ashoka commissioned the expansion of Dhamek Stupa. Dhamek Stupa was further expanded in 500 CE.

A 17th-century Jain manuscript describes a Jain temple in Varanasi as a pilgrimage site for Jains. The temple is located close to "a famous Bodisattva sanctuary" at a place called dharmeksā.

In what is the first incontrovertible reference to the ruins at Sarnath, Jonathan Duncan (a charter member of the Asiatic Society and later Governor of Bombay) described the discovery of a green marble reliquary encased in a sandstone box in the relic chamber of a brick stupa at that location. The reliquary was discovered in January 1794, during the dismantling of a stupa (referred to by Alexander Cunningham as stupa "K" or the "Jagat Singh stupa", later identified as the Dharmarajika Stupa) by employees of Zamindar Jagat Singh (the dewan of Maharaja Chait Singh, the Raja of Benares). Duncan published his observations in 1799. The reliquary contained a few bones and some pearls, which were subsequently thrown into the Ganges river. The reliquary itself has also disappeared, although the outer sandstone box was replaced in the relic chamber, where it was rediscovered by Cunningham in 1835. The bricks of the stupa were hauled off and used for the construction of the market in Jagatganj, Varanasi. Jagat Singh and his crew also removed a large part of the facing of the Dhamek Stupa, and removed several Buddha statues which he retained at his house in Jagatganj.

Gallery

References

Cited works

5th century in India
Archaeological monuments in Uttar Pradesh
Buddhist relics
Buddhist temples in Uttar Pradesh
Buildings and structures completed in the 5th century
Buildings and structures in Varanasi
Gupta Empire
Dhamek Stupa
Stupas in India
Tourist attractions in Varanasi district